William Early Jones (1808 or 1810 – April 18, 1871) was a justice of the Supreme Court of the Republic of Texas from 1843 to 1845.

References

Justices of the Republic of Texas Supreme Court
1800s births
1871 deaths
19th-century American judges